The Tun Fatimah Stadium is a multi-use stadium in Semabok, Melaka, Malaysia.

Name
The stadium gets its name from Tun Fatimah, a 16th-century Malaccan hero.

Notable events
 13th Sukma Games in June 2010

See also
 List of tourist attractions in Melaka
 List of football stadiums in Malaysia

References

Athletics (track and field) venues in Malaysia
Buildings and structures in Malacca
Football venues in Malaysia
Multi-purpose stadiums in Malaysia